The Indische Partij (IP) or Indies Party was a short-lived but influential political organisation founded in 1912 by the Indo-European (Eurasian) journalist E.F.E. Douwes Dekker and the Javanese physicians Tjipto Mangoenkoesoemo and Soewardi Soerjaningrat. As one of the first political organisations pioneering Indonesian nationalism in the colonial Dutch East Indies it inspired several later organisations such as the Nationaal Indische Party (N.I.P.) or Sarekat Hindia in 1919 and Indo Europeesch Verbond (I.E.V.) in 1919. Its direct successor was Insulinde.

Foundation

Although short lived and accumulating a little over 7,000 members its influence as the first multi-racial political party that clearly stated the, at the time radical, notion of independence was far reaching. The IP’s aim was to unite all native peoples of the Indies in a struggle for an independent nation. When the IP was banned and its leadership exiled, members of the IP founded the equally radical Insulinde.
Under the slogan of “Indie voor Indiers” membership was opened to Indo-Europeans, Dutch permanent settlers, Indo-Chinese natives and all indigenous peoples. Inspired by the leading role Eurasian Ilustrados had played in the independence struggle in the Philippines, the IP envisioned a similar uniting role for the Indo Eurasians in the Indies. Over 5,000 of its 7,000 members were Indos.

Douwes Dekker however also warned the Indo community not to carry on the racist notions indoctrinated by the colonial system.

In 1912 the removal of the Batavia school for Civil Servants from the Dutch East Indies and the ban on establishing a Medical school for Indo-Europeans and Indo-Chinese had contributed to a strong undercurrent of dissatisfaction and the IP membership numbers were rising speedily. Within a month the Party’s magazine had a 1,000 paying subscribers. In fear of a Malay language edition and collaboration with the ‘Sarekat Islam’ the colonial authorities stepped up its efforts to ban the IP.

Ban
When in July 1913 IP founder Tjipto was chairman of the ‘Bumi Putra’ committee and commissioned IP co-founder Soewardi’s famous ironic pamphlet ‘If I would have been a Dutchman.’ (Als Ik Een Nederlander Was) all 3 IP founders were put on trial.

Explicitly and vigorously opposing widespread racial discrimination by the colonial elite of expatriate Dutchmen and advocating total independence from the Netherlands, the colonial government hastened to brand the political organisation as subversive and banned it only one year after its foundation.

Exactly one year after the foundation of the IP all 3 founders were exiled to the Netherlands. They were able to remain politically active and eventually return to the Dutch East Indies. Tjipto became future president Sukarno's second political mentor, after an imprisonment in Banda he died in 1943. After Indonesia's declaration of independence in 1945 Douwes Dekker, now named Danoedirdja Setiaboeddhi, became minister of state in the cabinet of Indonesian prime minister Sjahrir. Soewardi became Indonesian minister of education in 1949, having changed his name to Ki Hadjar Dewantara in 1922.

See also
P.F. Dahler
Karel Zaalberg

References

Citations

Works cited

Further reading

External links
 E. F. E. Douwes Dekker: The Indies Party, its nature and objectives, 1913
 Indonesian online article 
 Indonesian online article.

Dutch East Indies
Indo people
Indonesian nationalism